Sangaris duplex is a species of beetle in the family Cerambycidae. It was described by Bates in 1881. It is known from Argentina, Brazil, and Paraguay.

References

duplex
Beetles described in 1881